Heizmannia (Heizmannia) greenii is a species complex of zoophilic mosquito belonging to the genus Heizmannia. It is found in Sri Lanka, India, Malaya, Cambodia, Laos, Nepal, Philippines, Vietnam, Thailand, Indochina, China, and Borneo.

References

External links
Morphological variability of adult Heizmannia greenii (Diptera: Culicidae) from Sri Lanka
Redescription of Heizmannia (Heizmannia) greenii Theobald from Sri Lanka (Diptera: Culicidae) 1989
A NEW SPECIES OF HEIZMANNIA FROM SRI LANKA (DIPTERA: CULICIDAE)

greenii